The Aesthetic Group Gymnastics European Championships are the european championships for the sport of aesthetic group gymnastics. Aesthetic Group Gymnastics is a discipline not currently recognized by the Fédération Internationale de Gymnastique. European Championships are organized annually since 2016 by the International Federation of Aesthetic Group Gymnastics (IFAGG). Initially, the competition was organized every year, but then in 2018 they decided to organize it every two years. In 2020, the event was postponed to 2021 due to a COVID-19 pandemic.

Editions

Medalists

Senior

Junior

All-time medal table

2000-2021
 Last updated after the 2021 European Aesthetic Group Gymnastics Championships

External links
 International Federation of Aesthetic Group Gymnastics

References

Aesthetic group gymnastics
Recurring sporting events established in 2016